Bustins Island is an island in inner Casco Bay, Maine, United States. It is part of the town of Freeport, in Cumberland County. Although physically located within Freeport, the Bustins Island Village Corporation is a self-governing entity. The island has approximately 117 summer cottages.

It is bisected by offshoot roads. Every island building stands beside one of the roads, allowing for easy access for trash removal.

The island operates its own ferry, the Lilly B, which debarks from the South Freeport town wharf. Typically, the ferry operates from Memorial Day weekend through Columbus Day weekend. Archie Ross formerly captained the ferry for over fifty years. The ferry arrives at public dock at the southwestern tip of the island, but there is also a steamer dock on the island's western side. A public landing ramp is located at the northern end of the island.

The island's interior is undeveloped because it is part of a resource protection area, which comprises parcels of land that are now protected against development. It, as with the rest of the island, is under constant threat of fire. There is no pressured water on the island, and since all of the cottages are over one hundred years old, they can be easily set alight accidentally. Six houses have burned to the ground over the years, the last in 2007. Due to this risk, no open fires or fire pits are permitted.

The island is named for John Bustion, while its ferry, the Lilly B, is named for Lilly May Brewer (1906–1977), who, along with her husband Ralph (1900–1968), was the caretaker of Bustins during the 1950s and 1960s.

Amenities

The Store 

The Store is located on Bustins Island Road, near the public dock. It was originally a general store that adjoined the former Ships Inn Restaurant. The two buildings are now the home of the island's post office, the library, nature center, Ships Inn museum, first-aid room and offices for the Bustins Island Village Corporation (BIVC).

Community House 
Located closer to the center of the island, the Community House is the hub of many activities on the island.

Schoolhouse 
Standing beside the Community House, the schoolhouse was built in 1888. Its first teacher was John Hackett, who had eleven pupils. It has been renovated by the Bustins Island Historical Society (BIHS).

Fire Barn 
Also located next to the Community House, the fire barn is home to two of the island's four fire trucks, as well as its tractor and utility trailers.

Brewer Cottage 
Owned by the Brewer family, the cottage is a central meeting place for the island's committees.

Recreation 
The island has a six-hole golf course, on its eastern side, and tennis courts, at the island's center, behind the fire barn.

Notable people 
Cole Porter was a camper at the island's all-boys summer camp, run by Admiral Donald Baxter MacMillan, the former arctic explorer.

Bibliography 

 History of Bustins Island, Casco Bay, 1660–1960, George B. Richardson (1960)

See also
 List of islands of Maine

References

External links
 Island government website

Islands of Cumberland County, Maine
Islands of Casco Bay
Freeport, Maine
Islands of Maine